Dima Ghawi (born July 18, 1975) is a Jordanian American award-winning author, leadership keynote speaker, and executive coach. She is the founder of Dima Ghawi, LLC, and the author of Breaking Vases: Shattering Limitations & Daring to Thrive - A Middle Eastern Woman's Story (2018).

Biography
Ghawi was born in Ankara, Turkey, raised in Amman, Jordan, and then immigrated to San Diego, California in 1996. She grew up surrounded by Middle Eastern culture and values which heavily influenced her early choices. Ghawi shared her story for the first time on the TEDxLSU stage in 2014.

Ghawi employs her story of escaping confinements, shattering barriers, crossing continents to empower others to dare to discover and create bold identities and transformational life purposes.

Career
She is a three-time TEDx speaker and an international best selling author of her memoir, Breaking Vases: Shattering Limitations & Daring to Thrive - A Middle Eastern Woman's Story.

Ghawi has been recognized for her services with the 2014 President's Volunteer Service Award, the 2019 Baton Rouge Business Report's “2019 Influential Women in Business” Award, the 2014 Baton Rouge Business Report's “Forty Under 40” Award, and the 2016 Louisiana State University “Esprit de Femme Award”. She has been featured in numerous publications for her professional and philanthropic work.

Books

References

External links
 

Living people
1975 births
American people of Jordanian descent
American motivational speakers
University of San Diego alumni
San Diego State University alumni
People from Ankara
American women memoirists
21st-century American women